"Should I Stay or Should I Go" is a song by English punk rock band the Clash, from their album Combat Rock, written in 1981 and featuring Mick Jones on lead vocals. It was released in 1982 as a double A-sided single alongside "Straight to Hell", performing modestly on global music charts. In the United States, "Should I Stay or Should I Go" charted on the Billboard Hot 100 without reaching the top 40. The song received greater attention nearly a decade later as the result of an early-1990s Levi's jeans commercial, leading to the song's 1991 re-release, which topped the UK Singles Chart and reached the top ten in New Zealand and many European charts. The song was listed in Rolling Stones 500 Greatest Songs of All Time in 2004.

Background and production
Many rumours have arisen about the song's content, such as Jones' impending dismissal from the Clash or the tempestuous personal relationship between Jones and American singer Ellen Foley. "Should I Stay or Should I Go" was thought to be written by Jones about Foley, who sang the backing vocals on Meat Loaf's Bat Out of Hell LP. However, Jones himself said:
It wasn't about anybody specific and it wasn't pre-empting my leaving The Clash. It was just a good rockin' song, our attempt at writing a classic... When we were just playing, that was the kind of thing we used to like to play. – Mick Jones, 1991

The Spanish backing vocals were sung by Joe Strummer and Joe Ely:
On the spur of the moment I said 'I'm going to do the backing vocals in Spanish' ... We needed a translator so Eddie Garcia, the tape operator, called his mother in Brooklyn Heights and read her the lyrics over the phone and she translated them. But Eddie and his mum are Ecuadorian, so it's Ecuadorian Spanish that me and Joe Ely are singing on the backing vocals. – Joe Strummer, 1991

Releases
The song had various single releases. In North America, the American record label Epic Records released one edition with "Inoculated City" as its B-side in May 1982. Another edition by Epic with "First Night Back in London" as its B-side, released in July 1982, peaked at number 45 on the Billboard Hot 100 chart on the week ending 18 September 1982, the edition's tenth week on the chart. Another edition by Epic with "Cool Confusion" as its B-side, released in February 1983, peaked at number 50 in the Billboard Hot 100. Elsewhere, the international record label CBS Records released the song in September 1982 as a double A-side with "Straight to Hell". The double A-side release peaked at number 17 in the UK Single Chart on the week ending 17 October 1982, the release's fifth week on the chart.

Historically, the band rejected companies' requests to use their songs to advertise products, like Dr Pepper and British Telecom. Then in the early 1990s the company Levi's asked the band members' permission to use the song for a jeans commercial for the British audience. Despite the band often prioritising "creativity and idealism over commercial exploitation", the band members left the decision to the main songwriter Mick Jones, who approved the permission, rationalising that Levi's jeans had been part of the rock music culture rather than something to "object on moral grounds". The song was played for the Levi's commercial and then reissued on 18 February 1991 as a single, a decade after its original release, reaching number one on the UK Singles Chart. It became the band's only number-one single on the UK Chart. In that same year, Jones told NME journalist James Brown that he included BAD II's "Rush" in the single re-release to promote his newer band.

A live recording of the song was included on the album Live at Shea Stadium, which featured a concert performed on 13 October 1982 in New York. The song's music video from that performance was included on the DVD The Clash Live: Revolution Rock. Both discs were released on 6 October 2008.

Reception
NME journalist Adrian Thrills in 1982 gave the double A-side single release "Straight to Hell"/"Should I Stay or Should I Go" four-and-a-half stars out of five. Despite "Should I Stay or Should I Go" having received more radio airplay, Thrills stated that the single's other A-side track "Straight to Hell" was "the reaffirmation that there is still life in The Clash."

In November 2004, the song was ranked number 228 on "Rolling Stone's 500 Greatest Songs of All Time" list. In 2009 it was ranked 42nd on VH1's program 100 Greatest Hard Rock Songs.

Scholar Theodore Gracyk wrote in 2007 that the song "is not [as] overtly political" as most of the band's other songs, especially from the album Combat Rock, which carries the song. Gracyk further wrote that new listeners familiar with and praising the song and then wanting to buy Combat Rock or one of compilation albums containing the song would be surprised by the band's "strong critique of dominant Western values." Vulture writer Bill Wyman in 2017 ranked the song number 19 of all the band's 139 songs.

Charts

Original release

Reissue

Weekly charts

Year-end charts

Download

Certifications

Opening riff similarity
Twitter users accused One Direction's 2012 hit single, "Live While We're Young", of copying the song's opening guitar riff, which caused controversy. According to Alexis Petridis of The Guardian, the guitar is played thrice between the riff with the plectrum stroking the strings, while it is pressed. One note in the chord is changed, which Petridis surmised was probably to avoid paying any royalty to the Clash.

Video
The video for the song was made by Don Letts and featured Joe Strummer in sunglasses and a Davy Crockett hat and Mick Jones in a red jumpsuit and beret. The band were filmed driving to a gig in an open-topped Cadillac.

See also
List of UK Singles Chart number ones of the 1990s

References

Songs about parting
1982 songs
1982 singles
1991 singles
Epic Records singles
The Clash songs
Macaronic songs
UK Singles Chart number-one singles
Songs written by Mick Jones (The Clash)
Songs written by Topper Headon
Songs written by Paul Simonon
Songs written by Joe Strummer
Music videos directed by Don Letts